Renaissance Barcelona Fira Hotel, previously Hotel Catalonia Plaza Europa, is a skyscraper and hotel in L'Hospitalet de Llobregat (suburb of Barcelona), Catalonia, Spain. Completed in 2011, has 26 floors and rises 105 metres. Lies on the Plaça d'Europa 50. It is part of the Renaissance Hotels group.

See also 
 List of tallest buildings and structures in Barcelona

References

External links

Skyscraper hotels in Barcelona
Hotel buildings completed in 2011